Musa Beg was an official in late Safavid Iran, who served as controller of the assay (mo'ayyer ol-mamalek) in 1713–14 under Shah Sultan Husayn (1694-1722). He was of Armenian descent, his grandfather having converted to Islam.

References

Persian Armenians
Controllers of the assay of the Safavid Empire
18th-century people of Safavid Iran
Ethnic Armenian Shia Muslims
18th-century deaths

Year of birth unknown
Year of death unknown